Mario Almirante (18 February 1890 – 30 September 1964) was an Italian film director and screenwriter active between 1920 and 1933. His 1927 film La bellezza del mondo featured an early appearance of Vittorio De Sica. He was the father of fascist politician Giorgio Almirante.

Selected filmography
 Zingari (1920)
 La bellezza del mondo (1927)
 Courtyard (1931)
 Fanny (1933)

References

External links

1890 births
1964 deaths
People from Molfetta
Italian film directors
20th-century Italian screenwriters
Italian male screenwriters
20th-century Italian male writers